Patricia Anne Acquaviva Gabow (born January 1944) is an American academic physician, medical researcher, healthcare executive, author and lecturer. Specializing in nephrology, she joined the department of medicine, division of renal diseases, at the University of Colorado School of Medicine in 1973, advancing to a full professorship in 1987; she is presently Professor Emerita. She was the principal investigator on the National Institutes of Health Human Polycystic Kidney Disease research grant, which ran from 1985 to 1999, and defined the clinical manifestations and genetics of the disease in adults and children. She served for two decades as CEO of Denver Health, an integrated public healthcare system in Denver, Colorado, where she implemented numerous business-based systems to streamline operations, improve patient care, and recognize cost savings. In particular, her introduction of the "Lean" quality-improvement system, based on the Toyota Production System, earned her national recognition. She is the author of more than 150 articles and book chapters, three books, and has received numerous awards for excellence in teaching, physician care, and leadership. She was inducted into the Colorado Women's Hall of Fame in 2004.

Early life and education
Patricia Anne Acquaviva was born in January 1944 to an Italian-American family. Her parents, Pat Acquaviva and Terese Colonna Acquaviva, married in 1942. Her father, a private first class in the US army, was killed in action in March 1945 during the Allied advance from Paris to the Rhine, after which she and her mother moved in with her uncle and grandparents. Her mother, a teacher, remarried to James R. Helmintoller in 1951.

She earned her B.S. in biology at Seton Hill College in 1965. She received her M.D. at the Perelman School of Medicine at the University of Pennsylvania in 1969.

Academic career
After interning in medicine for one year at the hospital of the University of Pennsylvania, she undertook a one-year residency in internal medicine at Harbor General Hospital in 1970. This was followed by one-year renal fellowships at San Francisco General Hospital and the hospital of the University of Pennsylvania. In 1973 Gabow joined Denver Health and Hospitals to establish its nephrology department. She began as an instructor in the Division of Renal Diseases at the University of Colorado, advancing to a full professorship in 1987.

Health administrator

Gabow served as Chief of Renal Disease for Denver Health and Hospitals, a city charter department, from 1973 to 1981. In 1976 she was appointed Clinical Director of the department of medicine for Denver Health, also serving in this position until 1981. In 1981 she was appointed Director of Medical Services for Denver Health, serving in this position for a decade. Gabow was named Deputy Manager of Medical Affairs (CMO) for Denver Health in 1989, and was appointed as CEO and Medical Director in 1992. After the creation of an independent state health authority called Denver Health and Hospitals Authority (DHHA) in 1997, Gabow served as CEO and Medical Director of DHHA from 1997 to 2008, and as CEO of DHHA from 2008 to 2012.

Under Gabow's leadership, Denver Health introduced several business-based improvement systems to streamline operations, cut excessive spending, and improve employee satisfaction and patient care. Most notable was the "Lean" quality-improvement system based on the Toyota Production System, introduced in 2005. The Lean management system cuts waste and streamlines processes without restricting access to healthcare by insured patients or necessitating staff layoffs. As one example of the Lean system, Denver Health increased the square footage of its public health facilities by 30 percent, yet it reduced its supply costs by 50 percent. In 2014 Gabow published a book on the use of the Lean system at Denver Health, titled The Lean Prescription: Powerful Medicine for Our Ailing Healthcare System. She and her co-author Philip L. Goodman received the 2015 Shingo Research and Professional Publication Award for the book, while Denver Health itself received the Shingo Bronze Medallion.

Other "best practices" which Gabow adopted from other industries include "advice nurse lines", new IT systems, and an employee reward program. During Gabow's tenure, Denver Health invested more than $400 million in IT, and recognized cost savings first by transferring 75% of billing to electronic statements and then by going paperless. In 2011, the healthcare system achieved the lowest medical mortality rate among 114 academic medical centers in the University HealthCare Consortium. Gabow retired from Denver Health in September 2012.

Research
Early in her career, Gabow specialized in nephrology with a focus on polycystic kidney disease. She was the principal investigator on the National Institutes of Health Human Polycystic Kidney Disease research grant, which ran from 1985 to 1999. She was also the principal investigator on the Community Voices: Health Care for the Underserved, a $5 million research grant funded by the W. K. Kellogg Foundation/Colorado Trust, from 1997 to 2007, and led other studies for the Agency for Healthcare Research and Quality. Gabow has published more than 150 research papers and book chapters, and 3 books. Her most recent book is TIMES NOW for Women Healthcare Leaders: A Guide for the Journey.

Memberships
Gabow is a master of the Association of American Physicians. She has been a member of the Medicaid and CHIP Payment and Access Commission, the Robert Wood Johnson Foundation board, and the Health Advisory Committee of the National Governors' Association. In 2013 she joined the healthcare advisory council of Simpler Consulting. She served on the board of trustees of her alma mater, Seton Hill University, from 2017-2018.

Awards and honors
Gabow is the recipient of numerous awards recognizing excellence in teaching and physician care, including the 1998 A.N. Richards Distinguished Achievement Award in Nephrology from the University of Pennsylvania School of Medicine, the 2000 Florence Rena Sabin Award from the University of Colorado Health Sciences Center, the 2000 Nathan Davis Award for Career Public Servant at the Local Level from the American Medical Association, Washington, D. C., and the Health Quality Award from the National Committee for Quality Assurance. She was named one of the "50 Most Powerful Physician Executives in Health Care" by Modern Healthcare magazine in 2007 and 2009, the Healthcare Leader of the Year by the Denver Business Journal in 2011, and received the 2008 National Center for Healthcare Leadership Award for lifetime achievement. For her implementation of the Lean quality-improvement system in the healthcare industry, she was awarded the "Innovator in Health" award by the New England Healthcare Institute in 2010 and was inducted into the Association for Manufacturing Excellence Hall of Fame.

Gabow has been recognized as a leading woman physician and role model by numerous organizations. She received the National Board of the Medical College of Pennsylvania Annual Award to an Outstanding Woman Physician in 1982, the Women of Distinction Award from the Mile Hi Council of Girl Scouts in 1998, and the Outstanding Women in Business award from the Denver Business Journal in 2005. The International Women's Forum and Colorado Women's Forum honored her as one of the Women Who Make a Difference in 2005, and the Women's Foundation of Colorado named her a Unique Woman of Colorado in 2007. She was inducted into the Colorado Women's Hall of Fame in 2004.

Gabow received an honorary doctorate in science from the University of Colorado in 2009 and an honorary degree from the University of Denver in 2010.

Personal life
In June 1971 she married Harold N. Gabow, a doctoral student in computer science at Stanford University. Harold Gabow began teaching in the department of computer science at the University of Colorado Boulder in 1973, becoming a full professor in 1986 and professor emeritus in 2008. The couple have a son and a daughter.

References

External links
List of research papers by Patricia A. Gabow, ResearchGate

1944 births
Living people
American women chief executives
American nephrologists
University of Colorado Denver faculty
Seton Hill University alumni
Perelman School of Medicine at the University of Pennsylvania alumni
American women academics
21st-century American women